Glyphodes multilinealis, the fig-tiger-moth, is a species of moth of the family Crambidae described by George Hamilton Kenrick in 1907. It is found in Papua New Guinea, Fiji, Niue, the Cook Islands, the Society Islands, in Australia and Japan.

Biology
Its larvae had been reared in Fiji on Ficus prolixa.

References

External links
Boldsystems.org: images of Glyphodes multilinealis

Glyphodes
Moths of Japan
Moths described in 1907